Witu is a small market town in the Lamu County of Kenya, East Africa. Formerly it was the capital of Wituland.

Location
It is on the Garsen–Witu–Lamu Highway (C-112) between Mkunumbi,  to the east, and Garsen,  to the west. The coordinates of Witu, Kenya are: 2°23'20.0"S, 40°26'16.0"E (Latitude:-2.388897; Longitude:40.437769).

Population
As of September 2013, the population of the town was estimated at 5,380.

Wituland

It was inhabited by slaves fleeing the Zanzibar slave trade, and was thus a target of attacks from the Sultanate of Zanzibar, circa 1850.

See also
 List of roads in Kenya
Historic Swahili Settlements
Swahili architecture

References

Swahili people
Swahili city-states
Swahili culture
Populated coastal places in Kenya
Populated places in Lamu County